Tim Kirk is both a professional artist and an American fan artist. He worked as a senior designer at Tokyo DisneySea, as an Imagineer for the Walt Disney company. He began his professional art career during the mid-1970s as an illustrator at Kansas City's Hallmark Cards company. He earned his Bachelor’s Degree in Fine Arts, with an emphasis in commercial art, and his Master’s Degree in Illustration from California State University, Long Beach. His Master's thesis project consisted of a series of paintings from The Lord of the Rings  trilogy by J.R.R. Tolkien; 13 of these were published by Ballantine Books as the 1975 Tolkien Calendar. Today, Kirk is retired from his design firm, Kirk Design, Inc., located in the Los Angeles, California area. He also sits on the advisory board of Seattle's Science Fiction Museum and Hall of Fame.

Hugo Awards
Kirk won the Hugo Award for Best Fan Artist in 1970, 1972, 1973, 1974, and in 1976. With Ken Keller, he co-designed the first cold-cast resin base used for a Hugo, given in 1976 by the World Science Fiction Society at Kansas City's 34th World Science Fiction Convention; he has been additionally nominated other times for the award.

References

External links

  (as of 2017-03-18: "Kirk Design is closed" with telephone reference)
 Hugo Award Winners from the 1970s
 
 

American illustrators
Hugo Award-winning artists
Living people
Tolkien artists
1947 births